Sonny Stitt Plays (also referred to as Sonny Stitt, Sonny Stitt, Sonny Stitt, Sonny Stitt, Sonny Stitt) is an  album by saxophonist Sonny Stitt recorded in 1955 and originally released on the Roost label.

Reception
The Allmusic site awarded the album 3 stars.

Track listing 
All compositions by Sonny Stitt except as indicated
 "There Will Never Be Another You" (Harry Warren, Mack Gordon) - 4:33 
 "The Nearness of You" (Hoagy Carmichael, Ned Washington) - 5:08 
 "Biscuit Mix (Carpsie's Groove)" - 3:14
 "Yesterdays" (Jerome Kern, Otto Harbach) - 4:56  
 "Afterwards" - 3:14 
 "If I Should Lose You" (Ralph Rainger, Leo Robin) - 4:15  
 "Blues for Bobby" - 4:48 
 "My Melancholy Baby" (Ernie Burnett, George A. Norton) 5:36 
 "The Nearness Of You" [alternate take] (Carmichael, Washington) - 5:22 Bonus track on CD reissue 
 "If I Should Lose You" [alternate take] (Rainger, Robin) - 4:29 Bonus track on CD reissue
Recorded at Capitol Studios in New York City on December 15 (tracks 1-4 & 9) and December 16 (tracks 5-8 & 10), 1955
The Bonus tracks must be from the box set. They are not on the current Japanese Import CD

Personnel 
Sonny Stitt - alto saxophone
Hank Jones - piano
Freddie Green - rhythm guitar (tracks 1-4 & 9)
Wendell Marshall - bass
Shadow Wilson - drums

References 

1956 albums
Roost Records albums
Sonny Stitt albums
Albums produced by Teddy Reig